William Henry Milner (born 4 March 1995) is an English actor. He starred as Will Proudfoot in Son of Rambow (2007), Edward in Is Anybody There? (2008), and the young Erik Lensherr in X-Men: First Class (2011).

Early life
William Henry Milner was born on 4 March 1995 in Teddington, London. He grew up in Hampton, London.

Career
Milner made his acting debut in the Hammer & Tongs film Son of Rambow (2007). That same year, he appeared in the made-for-TV films Who Killed Mrs De Ropp? and My Boy Jack. Milner then starred alongside Michael Caine in Is Anybody There? (2008). He appeared in the film adaptation of the David Almond book Skellig (2009). Milner portrayed Ian Dury's son Baxter in the biopic Sex & Drugs & Rock & Roll (2010). He played the role of young Erik Lensherr / Magneto in the superhero film X-Men: First Class (2011). He played the role of Tom Harvey in the Netflix film, iBoy (2017).

Filmography

Film

Television

Music videos
 Tame Impala – "Mind Mischief" (2012)

Awards and nominations

References

External links
 
 

1995 births
21st-century English male actors
English male child actors
English male film actors
English male television actors
Living people
Male actors from Surrey
People from the London Borough of Hackney
People educated at Teddington School